Young Brigham is an album by American folk musician Ramblin' Jack Elliott, released in 1968.

History
Young Brigham was Elliott's first major-label release on the Reprise label. The liner notes were written by his friend Johnny Cash.

The subject of "Goodnight Little Arlo" by Woody Guthrie is his son, Arlo Guthrie. "912 Greens" documents Elliott and his friends' search for Billy Faier in New Orleans.

Reception

Writing for Allmusic, music critic Ronnie D. Lankford, Jr. wrote the album "The difference between Elliott's versions [of the songs] and those of your average folksinger is that he sounds as though he's having a good time. Young Brigham is a nice snapshot of Elliott in the late ‘60s and shows him leaving the confines of a large studio with his folk heritage intact."

Reissues
Selections from Young Brigham was reissued on CD with selections from Bull Durham Sacks & Railroad Tracks as Me & Bobby McGee by Rounder Records in 1995.
Young Brigham was reissued on CD by Collector's Choice Music in 2001.

Track listing 
"If I Were a Carpenter" (Tim Hardin) – 5:04
"Talking Fisherman" (Woody Guthrie) – 4:00
"Tennessee Stud" (Jimmy Driftwood) – 4:51
"Tractor" (Jack Elliott) – 0:59
"Night Herding Song" (Traditional; arranged by Jack Elliott) – 3:56
"Rock Island Line" (Traditional; arranged by Jack Elliott) – 5:29
"Danville Girl" (Traditional; arranged by Jack Elliott) – 3:32
"912 Greens" (Elliott) – 7:23
"Don't Think Twice, It's All Right" (Bob Dylan) – 3:51
"Connection" (Mick Jagger, Keith Richards) – 2:24
"Goodnight Little Arlo" (Woody Guthrie) – 2:57

Personnel
Ramblin' Jack Elliott – vocals, harmonica, guitar
Pete Childs – bass, dobro
Richard Greene – fiddle
Mitch Greenhill – guitar
Eric Hord – harmonica, autoharp
Bruce Langhorne – tabla
Jack O'Hara – bass
Bill Lee – organ
Mark Spoelstra – guitar
Production notes:
Bruce Langhorne – producer
Andy Richardson, Doc Siegel, Joe Sidore - engineer
Andy Wickham - executive producer
Henry Diltz – photography
Ed Thrasher - art direction
Johnny Cash – original liner notes
Richie Unterberger – reissue liner notes

References

External links
Ramblin' Jack Elliott Discography
Unterberger, Richie. 2001. Liner notes, Collector's Choice Music reissue

1968 albums
Ramblin' Jack Elliott albums
Reprise Records albums